Maksim Yuryevich Gerasin (born 12 March 1974) is a Russian professional football coach and a former player who works as an assistant manager with FC Nosta Novotroitsk

Club career
He played 5 seasons in the Russian Football National League for FC Zenit Chelyabinsk, FC Nosta Novotroitsk and FC Sodovik Sterlitamak.

Honours
 Russian Second Division Zone Ural/Povolzhye best goalkeeper: 2005.

References

1974 births
People from Verkhnebureinsky District
Living people
Soviet footballers
Russian footballers
Association football goalkeepers
FC Lada-Tolyatti players
FC Sodovik Sterlitamak players
FC Olimpia Volgograd players
FC Torpedo Miass players
Russian football managers
FC Nosta Novotroitsk players
Sportspeople from Khabarovsk Krai